The Sun Odyssey 30i is a French sailboat that was designed by Marc Lombard as a cruiser and was first built in 2008.

The "i" in the designation indicates that the deck is injection-molded.

Production
The design was built by Jeanneau in France, starting in 2008, but it is now out of production.

Design
The Sun Odyssey 30i is a recreational keelboat, built predominantly of polyester fiberglass, with wood trim. The hull is made from solid fiberglass, while the deck is of fiberglass sandwich construction. It has a fractional sloop masthead sloop rig, with a deck-stepped mast, two sets of swept spreaders and aluminum spars with stainless steel 1X19 wire rigging. The hull has a nearly plumb stem, a reverse transom with a swimming platform, an internally mounted spade-type rudder controlled by a tiller or optional wheel, a fixed fin keel or optional stub keel, and a steel centerboard. The centerboard model has twin rudders and is designed to be beached. The fin keel model displaces  and carries  of cast iron ballast, while the centerboard version displaces  and carries  of cast iron exterior ballast.

A "performance" version is equipped with a mast that is about  taller, which results in a sail area increased by 3%.

The design has sleeping accommodation for four people, with a double "V"-berth in the bow cabin, two straight settees in the main cabin, and an aft cabin with a transversal double berth on the starboard side. The galley is located on the starboard side just forward to the companionway ladder. The galley is "L"-shaped and is equipped with a two-burner stove, an ice box and a sink. The head is located aft to port at the companionway and includes a shower.

See also
List of sailing boat types

References

External links

Yachting Monthly Sun Odyssey 30i video

Keelboats
2000s sailboat type designs
Sailing yachts
Sailboat type designs by Marc Lombard Design
Sailboat types built by Jeanneau